Cover My Song is a German television series broadcast on VOX channel and hosted by German hip hop artist Dennis Lisk also known by his stage name Denyo. The program is formatted on the successful Dutch television series Ali B op volle toeren that had premiered on the Dutch TROS channel. The first German series ran from 30 August 2011 until 11 October 2011 and included 7 episodes.

Format
The program is prepared as a "docutainment" (documentary entertainment) in which the viewers would learn about the story of German artists, follow their progress in their own words and discover their artistic process in making their hits. The host/presenter would invite in each episode an artist from the pop music tradition, and another artist from hip hop / rap tradition. They would pick a typical well-known song from the other artist's repertoire in a bid to prepare a "remake" / or cover version of the song and vice versa. Partaking artists are encouraged to use their own style giving the hits a real new twist. At the end of each episode, the artists get together with the host to perform the new interpretations, with many times the host participating in parts of the renditions. The artists would exchange opinions about the new revived versions.

Ratings
Cover My Song was followed on average of 950,000 viewers corresponding to a 4.4% market share, well below the station's average (5.7%). In the key demographic group of 14–49, it was seen on average by 690,000 viewers (7.3% of market share). The inaugural show saw the biggest following at 1,260,000.

Awards
In 2012, Cover My Song was nominated for Grimme-Preis  in the "best Entertainment" category, but did not win the prize. It was also nominated for the German Television Award in the "Best Documentary Entertainment / docutainment" award. The jury cited that it was "a refreshing program that generated merging of various musical genres".

Season 1

See also
Ali B op volle toeren
In de mix

External links
Official "Sing My Song" page on VOX website

German reality television series
2011 German television series debuts
2011 German television series endings
German-language television shows
VOX (German TV channel) original programming